Bahut Din Huwe is a 1954 Indian Hindi-language film directed by S. S. Vasan, produced by Gemini Studios and starring Madhubala. It is a remake of the Telugu film Bala Nagamma (1942).

Bahut Din Huwe received lukewarm reviews from critics upon its release in March 1954. The film was not a commercial success, although it went on to celebrate a silver jubilee in Poona.

Plot 
Madhubala plays the role of Princess Chandrakanta, who is born due to the blessings of Nagraj. However, due to the Nagraj's curse, the Queen dies as soon as the princess stops breastfeeding. The second Queen grows jealous and orders her men to kill the princess. However, she is left in the forest and gets adopted by a priest. The priest's wife believes she will bring misfortune to her family and ill treats her. When she grows up, she is spotted by Prince Anand Kumar, who immediately falls in love with her. She marries him and gives birth to a son. An evil magician king, Bhadra Chamund, decides to marry Chandrakanta upon finding out that she is the most beautiful woman in the world. He disguises himself as a saint and goes to her palace to beg for alms and kidnaps her. His wife Mohini warns him that like Ravan, he will meet his end because of kidnapping a woman who is devoted to her husband, but he pays no heed. When Prince Anand Kumar finds out, he marches to Bhadra Chamund's kingdom with his army to defeat him, but The Prince and the army are turned to stone by his magic.

Years later, Chandrakanta and Vijaykumar's son, Prince  Vijay Kumar (Rattan Kumar), who is brought up by the palace servants, learns the truth about his parents and resolves to free them. He reaches Bhadra Chamund's kingdom with his servant Tarang Sen (Agha) and manages to impress him by presenting him with a garland. By fooling the guards, he enters the jail and meets his mother Chandrakanta. He learns from her that across seven mountains and a dark cave lies a five coloured parrot, in which Bhadra Chamund has stored his soul. He sets upon on this dangerous journey, travels to the faraway land Mayanagari, faces several obstacles like women who try to hypnotise him by playing the veena, and encounters magical illusions like a garden containing talking animals.

Cast 
 Madhubala as Chandrakanta
 Rattan Kumar as Vijayakumar
 Swaraj as Prince Anand Kumar
 Agha as Tarang Sen
 Kailash as Bhadra Chamund
 Savitri as Mohini
 Pushpavalli as Bhulakshmi Devi
 Gulab as Flower Woman
 Kanhaiyalal as Pujari
 Lalita Pawar as Ekadasi
 Suryaprabha as Young Queen
 Neela as Mala
 Baby Saraswati as Young Chandra
 M. K. Radha as The King
 Roy Chowdhury as Nagaraj
 Indira Acharya as Maid
 Thousands of Gemini Boys and Girls

Production 
Bahut Din Huwe is a remake of the Telugu film Bala Nagamma (1942), and marked Savitri's debut in Hindi cinema. Shooting took place at Madras.

Songs 
"Saiyaan Tere Prem Ki Diwaani Ban Aai Hun" – Lata Mangeshkar
"Ammaa Ammaa Tu Kahaan Gai Amma" – Lata Mangeshkar
"Gajaananam, He Ganesh Gananaayak" – Lata Mangeshkar
"Vinaa Meri Aashaa Bhari, Kyun Chameli Khilakhilaati Hai Bata" – Lata Mangeshkar
"Mai Hu Rup Ki Rani" – Lata Mangeshkar
"Chanda Chamke Nil Gagan Mrunal" – Lata Mangeshkar

References

External links 
 

1954 films
Films directed by S. S. Vasan
1950s Hindi-language films
Gemini Studios films
Hindi remakes of Telugu films
Indian black-and-white films